Elachista aluta is a moth of the family Elachistidae. It is found in north-eastern Queensland.

The wingspan is 9-9.2 mm for males. The forewings are bluish grey and the hindwings are dark grey.

References

Moths described in 2011
Elachistidae
Moths of Australia
Taxa named by Lauri Kaila